Badakhshan University (built in 1996) is located in  Badakhshan province, northeastern Afghanistan. Established in 1988, Badakhshan University is a non-profit public higher education institution located in the large town of Faizabad (population range of 50,000-249,999 inhabitants). 

Notable alumni of Badakhshan University include Faiza Darkhani.

See also 
List of universities in Afghanistan

References

Universities in Afghanistan
University
Educational institutions established in 1996
1996 establishments in Afghanistan